Manito is a village in Mason County, Illinois, United States. The population was 1,552 at the 2020 census, down from 1,642 in 2010.

Geography
Manito is located in northeastern Mason County at  (40.422723, -89.780056). The northernmost border of the village follows the Tazewell County line.

Demographics

As of the census of 2000, there were 1,733 people, 686 households, and 506 families residing in the village. The racial makeup of the village was 99.08% White, 0.23% African American, 0.17% Native American, 0.17% Asian, and 0.35% from two or more races. Hispanic or Latino of any race were 0.29% of the population.

There were 686 households, out of which 32.9% had children under the age of 18 living with them, 61.8% were married couples living together, 9.0% had a female householder with no husband present, and 26.1% were non-families. 22.0% of all households were made up of individuals, and 10.8% had someone living alone who was 65 years of age or older. The average household size was 2.52 and the average family size was 2.93.

In the village, the population was spread out, with 25.0% under the age of 18, 8.1% from 18 to 24, 27.6% from 25 to 44, 25.6% from 45 to 64, and 13.8% who were 65 years of age or older. The median age was 37 years. For every 100 females, there were 102.5 males. For every 100 females age 18 and over, there were 92.6 males.

The median income for a household in the village was $41,767, and the median income for a family was $48,438. Males had a median income of $36,927 versus $21,506 for females. The per capita income for the village was $18,345. About 5.4% of families and 8.2% of the population were below the poverty line, including 8.3% of those under age 18 and 6.3% of those age 65 or over.

Transportation

Notable people
 Henry Alfred Clauser, guitarist, songwriter and engineer featured on radio shows in Des Moines and Tulsa
 Joseph E. Daily, Chief Justice of the Illinois Supreme Court; born in Manito
 Helen Heckman, dancer, born in Manito
 H. V. Porter, educator and member of the Naismith Memorial Basketball Hall of Fame

References

External links
 

Villages in Mason County, Illinois
Villages in Illinois